Margaret Court and Judy Dalton were the defending champions, but lost in the semifinals to Françoise Dürr and Virginia Wade.

Rosie Casals and Billie Jean King defeated Dürr and Wade in the final, 6–2, 6–3 to win the ladies' doubles tennis title at the 1970 Wimbledon Championships.

Seeds

  Margaret Court /  Judy Dalton (semifinals)
  Rosie Casals /  Billie Jean King (champions)
  Karen Krantzcke /  Kerry Melville (semifinals)
  Françoise Dürr /  Virginia Wade (finals)

Draw

Finals

Top half

Section 1

Section 2

Bottom half

Section 3

Section 4

References

External links

1970 Wimbledon Championships – Women's draws and results at the International Tennis Federation

Women's Doubles
Wimbledon Championship by year – Women's doubles
Wimbledon Championships
Wimbledon Championships